Jerry T. Miller is an American politician. He is a Republican representing District 36 in the Kentucky House of Representatives.

Early life 

Miller was born in Louisville, Kentucky. He earned a Bachelor of Science in Accounting from the University of Kentucky in 1973.

Political career 

Miller served on the Louisville Metro Council from 2011 to 2014.

In 2014, Miller was elected to represent District 36 in the Kentucky House of Representatives. He was re-elected to the position twice, and is running again in 2020.

Electoral record 

Miller was unopposed in 2016.

References 

Living people
Republican Party members of the Kentucky House of Representatives
University of Kentucky alumni
Year of birth missing (living people)
21st-century American politicians